Jarmo Sakari Sandelin (born 10 May 1967) is a Swedish professional golfer who plays on the European Senior Tour. He had five European Tour wins and played in the 1999 Ryder Cup.

Early life
Sandelin was born in Imatra, Finland, but grew up in Sweden and became a Swedish citizen.

Professional career
Sandelin turned professional in 1987 and despite several visits to qualifying school, did not win a place on the European Tour until 1995 when he graduated from the second tier Challenge Tour by finishing in 9th place on the end of season rankings in 1994. He won the Turespana Open De Canaria during his début season as he finished in 21st place on the Order of Merit and was named the Sir Henry Cotton Rookie of the Year.

In 1996, Sandelin played on the United States-based PGA Tour, but made just one cut from 14 tournament starts during the season. He returned to Europe towards the end of the year with immediate success, winning the Madeira Island Open. He has won a total of five tournaments on the European Tour and his best season was 1999, when he won the Spanish and German Opens and finished 9th on the Order of Merit. He also made his only Ryder Cup appearance that year, but was only selected to play in the singles and lost his match against Phil Mickelson 5 and 3.

Sandelin suffered a loss of form after the turn of the century which culminated in a return to qualifying school in 2005. Having employed a coach for the first time in his career, he regained his European Tour card immediately. He managed to maintain his playing status another three years, although by small margins. In 2007 he edged out Lee Slattery for the last automatic card for 2008 by just €77. He entered the European Tour Qualifying School totally 12 times.

In May 2017, Sandelin became eligible for the European Senior Tour, from 2018 known as the Staysure Tour. The first season he played 13 tournaments, had seven top-10s, with a best tied-4th finish at the Farmfoods European Senior Masters and finished 17th on the 2017 European Senior Tour Order-of-Merit rankings. In 2018 Sandelin was runner-up in the Swiss Seniors Open and he had his first win on the senior tour in the final event of the 2019 season, the MCB Tour Championship – Mauritius, 18 years after his last European Tour win.

In 2001, he was awarded honorary member of the PGA of Sweden.

1997 Lancome Trophy
The European Tour tournament Lancome Trophy at Golf de Saint-Nom-la-Bretèche, 30 km west of Paris, France in September 1997, was won by Mark O'Meara, one stroke ahead of Sandelin. A television viewer in Sweden noted that, on the 15th green in the final round, O'Meara, facing a two and a half foot putt, had replaced his ball half an inch closer to the hole than had been indicated by his marker. Sandelin wrote to O'Meara in March 1998, sent a video recording of the incident and asked for an explanation. O'Meara insisted he had not intended to gain any advantage and sought advice from the PGA and European Tours, who informed him that the tournament was over and the result stood. Sandelin went public with the story and demanded that O'Meara should hand back the trophy and the prize money. O'Meara admitted in April 1998, he may, without intention, have broken the rules of golf on his way to winning the 1997 Lancome Trophy.

Professional wins (10)

European Tour wins (5)

1Co-sanctioned by the Asian Tour

European Tour playoff record (1–0)

Challenge Tour wins (2)

Other wins (2)

European Senior Tour wins (1)

Results in major championships

Note: Sandelin never played in the Masters Tournament.

CUT = missed the half-way cut
WD = withdrew
"T" = tied

Results in World Golf Championships

"T" = Tied

Results in senior major championships

"T" indicates a tie for a place
CUT = missed the halfway cut
NT = No tournament due to COVID-19 pandemic

Team appearances
Alfred Dunhill Cup (representing Sweden): 1995, 1996, 1999
World Cup (representing Sweden): 1995, 1996, 1999
Ryder Cup (representing Europe): 1999
Seve Trophy (representing Continental Europe): 2000 (winners)

See also
1995 PGA Tour Qualifying School graduates
2005 European Tour Qualifying School graduates
2009 European Tour Qualifying School graduates

References

External links
Official blog

Swedish male golfers
European Tour golfers
PGA Tour golfers
Ryder Cup competitors for Europe
People from Imatra
Golfers from Stockholm
Finnish emigrants to Sweden
1967 births
Living people